Kilaån is a river primarily running through the southern parts of Södermanland County in Sweden. Its exodus is in south Nyköping on the Södermanland coast. The river's mouth is only a few hundred metres from the larger river of Nyköpingsån. The peninsula of Arnö and Oxelösund is reached by crossing the small river, being only a few metres wide. The river passes by the rural localities of Stavsjö, Jönåker and Bergshammar on its way through Nyköping Municipality to the shoreline. It forms a sizeable river valley called Kiladalen in the last  of its course, with elevated forests to its south and rolling hills to the north. The river is also relatively flat from the beginning of said valley, with the confluence of the Ålberga and Vreta rivers into the main Kilaån being at merely  in spite of being at a distance from the river's mouth.

References

Rivers of Södermanland County